John Button (1929–12 December 1982) was an American artist, well known for his city-scapes. Educated at the University of California, Berkeley then moved to New York City in the early 1950s. He became friends with Fairfield Porter and Frank O'Hara and assumed his part in the New York School of Painters and Poets.

Amidst the frenzy of Abstract Expressionism, Button remained true to his interest in realism, and is now most commonly associated with such New York School artists as Fairfield Porter, Jane Freilicher, and Alex Katz. Button was a fine draftsman and drew from life models throughout his career. However, little known are his sketches of male nudes – studio models from the School of Visual Arts, where Button taught, as well as personal acquaintances.

At one point Button was in a relationship with the poet James Schuyler. Button died of a heart attack in New York City on 12 December 1982.

Exhibitions

 2009         "John Button, Reflections on Light," Bernhard Goldberg Fine Arts, East Hampton, NY
 2007-08      "John Button (1929-1982): Paintings and Drawing from the Estate," ClampArt, New York City
 1995         "Mexico 1958," Fischbach Gallery, New York City
 1994-95      "The City: New York Visions 1900-1995," ACA Galleries, Lizan-Tops Gallery, East Hampton, New York
 1994-95      "New York Realism Past and Present," Odakyu Museum, Odakyu, Japan
 1994-95      "New York Realism Past and Present," Kadoshima Dity Museum of Art, Tokyo, Japan
 1994-95      "New York Realism Past and Present," Kitakyushu Municipal Museum of Art, Kitakyushu, Japan
 1994-95      "New York Realism Past and Present," The Museum of Art Kintetsu, Osaka, Japan
 1994-95      "New York Realism Past and Present," Fukushima Prefectural Museum of Art, Fukushima, Japan
 1994-95      "New York Realism Past and Present," Tampa Museum of Art Tampa, Florida
 1994-95      "Male Desire," Mary Ryan Gallery New York
 1993         "The Collection: Porter's Circle," Parrish Art Museum, Southampton, New York
 1993         "Excellence in Watercolor," New Jersey Center for Visual Arts, Summit, New Jersey
 1992         "Studies Enroute," Benton Gallery, Southampton, New York
 1991         "John Button’s New York," Fischbach Gallery, New York City
 1990         "John Button," Fischbach Gallery, New York City
 1989-90      "John Button: Retrospective Exhibition," Currier Gallery of Art, Manchester, New Jersey
 1989-90      "John Button: Retrospective Exhibition," Stamford Museum and Nature Center, Stamford, Connecticut
 1989-90      "John Button: Retrospective Exhibition," Rahr-West Art Museum, Manitowoc, Wisconsin
 1989-90      "John Button: Retrospective Exhibition," Utah Museum of Fine Arts, Salt Lake City, Utah
 1988         "The Face of the Land," Southern Alleghenies Museum of Art, Loretto, Pennsylvania
 1985-87      "American Realism: Twentieth Century Drawings and Watercolors from the Glenn C. Janss Collection," Madison Art Center, Madison, Wisconsin
 1985-87      "American Realism: Twentieth Century Drawings and Watercolors from the Glenn C. Janss Collection," Archer M. Huntington Art Gallery, University of Texas, Austin, Texas
 1985-87      "American Realism: Twentieth Century Drawings and Watercolors from the Glenn C. Janss Collection," Mary and Leigh Block Gallery, Northwestern University, Evanston, Illinois
 1985-87      "American Realism: Twentieth Century Drawings and Watercolors from the Glenn C. Janss Collection," Williams College Museum of Art, Williamstown, Massachusetts
 1985-87      "American Realism: Twentieth Century Drawings and Watercolors from the Glenn C. Janss Collection," Akron Art Museum, Akron, Ohio
 1985-87      "American Realism: Twentieth Century Drawings and Watercolors from the Glenn C. Janss Collection," San Francisco Museum of Modern Art, San Francisco, California
 1985-87      "American Realism: Twentieth Century Drawings and Watercolors from the Glenn C. Janss Collection," DeCordova and Dana Museum and Park, Lincoln, Massachusetts
 1986         "John Button:  The Last Works," Fischbach Gallery, New York City
 1985-86      "City Views: Panoramas to Particulars," CIGNA Museum and Art Collection, Philadelphia, Pennsylvania
 1984         "John Button: Paintings and Gouaches," Visual Arts Museum, School of Visual Arts, New York City
 1984         "John Button:  An American Painter," The College Gallery, Keane College, Union, New Jersey
 1984         "Art and Friendship: A Tribute to Fairfield Porter," Guild Hall Museum, East Hampton, New York
 1982         "An Appreciation of Realism," Museum of Art, Munson-Williams-Proctor Institute, Utica, New York
 1982         "Contemporary Realist Painting: A Selection, Museum of Fine Arts, Boston, Massachusetts
 1980 Fischbach Gallery, New York City
 1979         "New York Now," Phoenix Art Museum, Phoenix, Arizona
 1978 Fischbach Gallery, New York City
 1976         "A Selection of American Art: The Skowhegan School 1946-1976," Institute of Contemporary Art, Boston, Massachusetts
 1976         "America 1976," Department of the Interior at the Cororan Gallery of Art, Washington, D.C.
 1976         "John Button," Gallery of July and August, Woodstock, New York
 1963-74 Kornblee Gallery, New York City
 1973         "The Male Nude," Emily Lowe Gallery, Hofstra University, Hempstead, New York
 1970 J.L. Hudson Gallery, Detroit
 1969         "Contemporary Portraits," Museum of Modern Art, New York City
 1968         "Realism Now," Vassar College Art Gallery, Poughkeepsie, New York
 1967 Franklin Siden Gallery, Detroit, Michigan
 1965         "Eight Landscape Painters," The International Council of the Museum of Modern Art, New York
 1965         "Eight Landscape Painters," Festival Dei Due Mondi di Spoleto, Italy
 1962         "Selections from the ARt Lending Service," Museum of Modern Art, New York
 1955-59      Tibor de Nagy Gallery, New York City
 1954-55      "Stable Annual," Stable Gallery New York
 1952         "Annual Exhibition: Artist of Los Angeles and Vicinity," Los Angeles County Museum of Art, Los Angeles

Public collections
Metropolitan Museum of Art, New York City;
Museum of Modern Art, New York City;
Columbia University, New York City;
Grey Art Gallery, New York University, New York City;
Whitney Museum of American Art, New York;
Guild Hall Museum, East Hampton, New York;
Parrish Art Museum, Southampton, New York;
Hirshhorn Museum and Sculpture Garden, Washington, DC;
San Francisco Museum of Modern Art, San Francisco;
Oakland Museum, Oakland, California;
Wadsworth Atheneum Museum of Art, Hartford, Connecticut;
Colby College, Colby, Maine;
Portland Museum of Art, Portland, Maine;
Currier Gallery of Art, Manchester, New Hampshire;
Newark Museum, Newark, New Jersey;
Weatherspoon Art Gallery, University of North Carolina at Greensboro, North Carolina;
Utah Museum of Fine Arts, Salt Lake City, Utah;
Utah State University, Logan, Utah;
Rahr-West Art Museum, Manitowoc, Wisconsin;
Snite Museum of Art, University of Notre Dame, Indiana;
Tampa Museum of Art, Tampa, Florida;
Jersey City Museum, New Jersey;
Long Island Museum, Stony Brook, New York;
New York Public Library, New York City;
Museum of the City of New York, New York City;
Rhode Island School of Design, Providence, Rhode Island;
St. Lawrence University, New York;
University of Rochester, New York

References

External links
John Button website
John Button at ClampArt
Review of 1991 Fischbach Gallery exhibition
Gerald L. Fabian papers on John Button at the Smithsonian Institution

1929 births
1982 deaths
University of California, Berkeley alumni
Painters from California
20th-century American painters
American male painters
20th-century American male artists